The 1937 Wyoming Cowboys football team represented the University of Wyoming in the Rocky Mountain Conference (RMC) during the 1937 college football season.  In its fourth season under head coach Willard Witte, the team compiled a 3–5 record (2–4 against RMC opponents) and was outscored by a total of 92 to 86.

Schedule

References

Wyoming
Wyoming Cowboys football seasons
Wyoming Cowboys football